QMI may refer to:

 QMI press agency, a division of the Canadian media conglomerate Quebecor Media
Quality Management Institute, a management systems registrar owned by SAI Global
Quebecor Media Inc., a Canadian media company
Qualcomm MSM Interface, a proprietary interface
Q-wave myocardial infarction, an older classification of myocardial infarction